WRQT (95.7 FM, 95.7 The Rock) is a radio station  broadcasting an Active Rock format. Licensed to La Crosse, Wisconsin, United States, the station serves the La Crosse area.  The station is currently owned by Mid-West Family Broadcasting. The station no longer broadcasts in HD Radio.

History
The station went on the air as WSPL-FM on 1979-07-30.  On 1980-01-29, the station changed its call sign to WSPL, on 1996-03-06 to WTRV, on 1998-04-01 to the current 95-7 The Rock WRQT,

References

External links

RQT
Active rock radio stations in the United States
Radio stations established in 1979
1979 establishments in Wisconsin